John Hope Johnstone may refer to:
 John Hope-Johnstone (1796–1876), Scottish Conservative MP, de jure 7th Earl of Annandale and Hartfell
 John Hope-Johnstone (1842–1912) (1841–1912), Scottish Conservative MP, de jure 8th Earl of Annandale and Hartfell
 John Hope-Johnstone (photographer) (1883–1970), artist associated with the Bloomsbury Group

See also 
 John Johnstone (disambiguation)